Jennifer Forgie (born January 4, 1969) is a Canadian actress and singer, who is often credited as Jenn Forgie.

Biography

Forgie is well known for her anime roles on Inuyasha, as Jakotsu, the homosexual member of The Band of Seven and Ranma ½ as Tsukasa. She also played May Kanker and Nazz von Bartonschmeer during the third season of the animated series Ed, Edd n Eddy. However, the creator, Danny Antonucci, preferred Nazz and May's previous voice, Erin Fitzgerald, and had her flown to Canada to replace her for future episodes. She has also appeared in a TV movie about Flight 93.

Filmography

External links

1969 births
Living people
Actresses from Vancouver
Canadian women singers
Canadian voice actresses
Musicians from Vancouver